The following are the national records in track cycling in Belgium maintained by Royal Belgian Cycling League.

Men
Key to tables:

Women

References
General
Belgian records 13 February 2023 updated
Specific

External links
Royal Belgian Cycling League official website

Belgian
Records
Track cycling
track cycling